Onavas Municipality is a municipality in Sonora in north-western Mexico.

Area and population
The municipal area is 529.48 km2 with a population of 479 registered in 2000. INEGI Most of this population lives in the small municipal seat.  It is located at an elevation of 180 meters.  The municipal population has been decreasing since 1980 when it was 586.

Neighboring municipalities
Neighboring municipalities are Soyopa to the north,  Yécora to the east, Suaqui Grande to the southwest, and  San Javier to the west.  Onavas is crosses by the Río Yaqui, which rises in Chihuahua and flows into the Pacific Ocean

References

Municipalities of Sonora